Sarrak may refer to:
 Sarrak, Iran
 Sarrak, alternate name of Chiveh
 Sarrak, alternate name of Sarrag
 Sarrak-e Khvajavi
 Sarrak-e Olya
 Sarrak-e Sofla

See also
 Sarak (disambiguation)